Gumucio is a surname. Notable people with the surname include:

Alfonso Gumucio Dagron (born 1950), Bolivian writer, filmmaker, journalist, photographer and development communication specialist 
Alfonso Gumucio Reyes (1914-1981), Bolivian politician
Arantza Gumucio (born 1989), Chilean competitive sailor
Begoña Gumucio (born 1992), Chilean competitive sailor
Cristián Parker Gumucio (born 1953), Chilean sociologist
Juan Carlos Gumucio (1949–2002), Bolivian-born journalist and writer
Rafael Gumucio (born 1970), Chilean writer and comedian